Frédéric Herpoel (born 16 August 1974) is a Belgian former professional footballer who played as a goalkeeper.

Career
Herpoel was born in Mons. At the age of 7 he began to play for S.C. Havré and then moved to Anderlecht in 1988 where he played in the youth team. Between 1993 (his arrival in the senior squad) and 1997, Herpoel only played four Jupiler League games for the Brussels side.

Herpoel signed for Gent in 1997 and played regularly for them for over a decade, before joining Mons. Herpoel was selected 39 times for Belgium but he gathered only seven caps. He was in the team for the Euro 2000 as third goalie and the 2002 World Cup as second goalie. He was the second choice after Geert De Vlieger when Robert Waseige was the national team manager, and later after Silvio Proto when Aimé Anthuenis coached the national team, whereupon he decided to quit the national team in 2005, disappointed not to be chosen as the first choice goalkeeper.

Honours 
Anderlecht
 Belgian First Division: 1993–94, 1994–95, 1994–95
 Belgian Cup: 1993–94, runner-up 1996–97
 Belgian Super Cup: 1993, 1995

Belgium
 FIFA Fair Play Trophy: 2002 World Cup

Individual
 Best AA Gent-Player of the Season: 2001–02, 2002–03, 2003–04, 2004–05
 Man of the Season (Belgian First Division): 2002–03
 Belgian Goalkeeper of the Year: 2004
 Belgian Fair Play Award: 2006–07, 2007–08

References

External links
 Biography from FHSPORT La marque de Frédéric Herpoel 
 
 

Living people
1974 births
Footballers from Hainaut (province)
Association football goalkeepers
Belgian footballers
Belgium international footballers
Belgium under-21 international footballers
Belgian Pro League players
R.S.C. Anderlecht players
K.A.A. Gent players
R.A.E.C. Mons players
UEFA Euro 2000 players
2002 FIFA World Cup players
Sportspeople from Mons